Group B of the men's football tournament at the 2020 Summer Olympics was played from 22 to 28 July 2021 in Kashima's Kashima Stadium, Sapporo's Sapporo Dome and Yokohama's International Stadium Yokohama. The group consistsed of Honduras, New Zealand, Romania and South Korea. The top two teams, South Korea and New Zealand, advanced to the knockout stage.

Teams

Standings

In the quarter-finals,
The winners of Group B, South Korea, advanced to play the runners-up of Group A, Mexico.
The runners-up of Group B, New Zealand, advanced to play the winners of Group A, Japan.

Matches

New Zealand vs South Korea

Honduras vs Romania

New Zealand vs Honduras

Romania vs South Korea

Romania vs New Zealand

South Korea vs Honduras

Discipline
Fair play points would have been used as a tiebreaker if the overall and head-to-head records of teams were tied. These were calculated based on yellow and red cards received in all group matches as follows:
first yellow card: minus 1 point;
indirect red card (second yellow card): minus 3 points;
direct red card: minus 4 points;
yellow card and direct red card: minus 5 points;

Only one of the above deductions is applied to a player in a single match.

References

External links
Men's Olympic Football Tournament Tokyo 2020, FIFA.com

Group B